Spekkoek (kue lapis legit or spekuk in Indonesian) is a type of Indonesian layer cake. It was developed during colonial times in the Dutch East Indies. The firm-textured cake is an Indo (Dutch-Indonesian) version of the European multi-layered spit cake. However it is not baked on a rotating spit, and contains a mix of Indonesian spices, such as cardamom, cinnamon, clove, mace and anise. The cake is made of flour and yolk and is rich in butter or margarine.

Spekkoek is popular in Indonesia and is served as a holiday treat, especially for natal, imlek, and lebaran. It is also served or given as gifts during many local festivities such as at birthday parties and weddings. In the Netherlands, the sliced cake can be found in most grocery stores and Asian markets (Tokos). It is traditionally served for dessert in rijsttafel. It is also a very popular dessert in Hadhramout.

Etymology
The Dutch term spekkoek translates literally as pork belly (or bacon) cake, a name derived from its appearance of dark and light layers. Its Indonesian name, lapis legit, means sweet layer cake. The English translation is often given as thousand layer cake, or thousand layer spice cake.

Origin
Spekkoek is thought to have been made by the wives of Dutch administrators in Batavia (modern-day Jakarta) during the colonial period and served during evening tea.

Preparation
As a spekkoek commonly has more than 18 layers, baking it requires patience and is a very labour-intensive process. The batter is mainly made of butter, flour and sugar with an approximate ratio of 1:1:2. Each layer is made by pouring a small amount of batter into a baking tin, which is then put into an oven and grilled from above until the layer has turned golden from the heat. The tin is then removed from the oven and the process repeated to build up the remaining layers. Dutch ovens with a charcoal fire on top of the lid are said to produce the best results, while electric ovens are superior to gas ovens as cakes bake much faster in the former.

Where clove buds or cardamom seeds are difficult to find, bakers can use spekkoek powder as a replacement. Milling and mixing the spices right before baking produces a cake with an excellent aroma. The ground spices must be sieved into the flour at least three times as the spice powder is very fine and tends to clump in the batter. In Indonesia, there are many varieties of lapis legit, including cakes containing almonds, cashew nuts, cheese, prunes or raisins, and even cakes flavoured with chocolate and pandan.

Market
Due to the effort required to bake the cake, it is a rather expensive delicacy, costing about €20 per kilogram in 2010 in the Netherlands. In Indonesia, a similar-sized lapis legit can cost up to Rp 400,000 (about €12.50).

Generally, a typical lapis legit cake is sold in a square pan (approx 20x20x6) and costs at least Rp 350,000 for a home-made, and up to Rp 900,000 for a special made (commercialised).

Similar cakes

In Malang, East Java, kue lapis malang or spiku malang refers to a two-layered cake, prepared using a different technique. Two batter mixes are prepared, one with naturally produced yellow colour, the other mixed with cocoa powder to produce a dark brown colour. The batter mixes are poured into two different baking tin and baked in the oven. To assemble, the cake is layered on top of the other with a thin layer of fruit jam in between. Similarly in Surabaya, kue lapis surabaya or spiku surabaya refers to a three-layered cake, prepared using a similar technique to spiku malang. The kue lapis surabaya is commonly used to make a birthday cake and wedding cake in Indonesia.

Lapis legit is similar to traditional Indonesian kue lapis, the difference being that lapis legit is a puffy layered cake, made of flour and is baked, while kue lapis is a moist layered pudding, made of rice flour and sago, and is steamed.

Lapis legit has also spread to Malaysia. A form developed in Sarawak is called the Sarawak layer cake or kek lapis Sarawak which has greater colour and flavour variations.

See also

 De Bazel, a building in Amsterdam nicknamed "De Spekkoek"
 Dobos torte, a similar Hungarian cake
 Kek lapis Sarawak, a similar Malaysian cake influenced by spekkoek
 Kue lapis
 Bebinca
 Baumkuchen
 List of cakes

References

Dutch fusion cuisine
Dutch words and phrases
Holiday foods
Kue
Layer cakes